Mohamed Bechir-Sow (born November 27, 1907 in Fort-Lamy, Chad, and died April 4, 1976 in N'Djamena) was a politician from Chad who served in the French Senate from 1947-1951 and the French National Assembly from 1951-1955 .

References 
page on the French Senate website
page on the French National Assembly website

1907 births
1976 deaths
People from N'Djamena
Chadian politicians
Rally of the French People politicians
French Senators of the Fourth Republic
Senators of French Equatorial Africa
Deputies of the 2nd National Assembly of the French Fourth Republic